1281 Jeanne is a dark asteroid from the background population of the intermediate asteroid belt. It was discovered on 25 August 1933, by astronomer Sylvain Arend at the Royal Observatory of Belgium in Uccle, who named it after his daughter, Jeanne.

Orbit and classification 

Jeanne is a non-family asteroid of the main belt's background population when applying the hierarchical clustering method to its proper orbital elements. It orbits the Sun in the central asteroid belt at a distance of 2.0–3.1 AU once every 4 years and 1 month (1,492 days; semi-major axis of 2.56 AU). Its orbit has an eccentricity of 0.21 and an inclination of 7° with respect to the ecliptic.

Naming 

This minor planet was named after Jeanne Arend, daughter of Belgian discoverer Sylvain Arend. The official naming citation was mentioned in The Names of the Minor Planets by Paul Herget in 1955.

Physical characteristics 

Jeanne has been characterized as both an X-type and P-type asteroid by the Wide-field Infrared Survey Explorer (WISE) and Pan-STARRS photometric survey, respectively.

Rotation period and poles 

In May 2002, a rotational lightcurve of Jeanne was obtained from photometric observations by French amateur astronomer Christophe Demeautis. Lightcurve analysis gave a rotation period of 15.18 hours with a brightness amplitude of 0.45 magnitude. A lightcurve was also modeled using photometric data from the Lowell Photometric Database. It gave a concurring sidereal period of  hours and two spin axes at (153.0°, 19°) and (338.0°, 32.0°) in ecliptic coordinates (λ, β).

Diameter and albedo 

According to the surveys carried out by the Infrared Astronomical Satellite IRAS, the Japanese Akari satellite and the NEOWISE mission of NASA's WISE telescope, Jeanne measures between 14.26 and 27.620 kilometers in diameter and its surface has an albedo between 0.053 and 0.17. The Collaborative Asteroid Lightcurve Link derives an albedo of 0.0863 and a diameter of 21.65 kilometers based on an absolute magnitude of 11.6.

References

External links 
 Lightcurve Database Query (LCDB), at www.minorplanet.info
 Dictionary of Minor Planet Names, Google books
 Asteroids and comets rotation curves, CdR – Geneva Observatory, Raoul Behrend
 Discovery Circumstances: Numbered Minor Planets (1)-(5000) – Minor Planet Center
 
 

001281
Discoveries by Sylvain Arend
Named minor planets
19330825